Bab Sidi Abdessalem is one of the gates of the medina of Tunis.

It was built in the reign of Hammouda Pasha, it takes its name from Abd As-Salam Al-Asmar, a holy man from Libya.

We find near this the door a Hafsid fountain and a souk.

References

Sidi Abdessalem